This is a list of volleyball teams that played in the Spikers' Turf.

A
 Adamson University
 AMC Cotabato Spikers
 Animo Green Spikers
 Arellano University
 Ateneo de Manila University
 Ateneo-Fudgee Barr Blue Eagles

C
 Cagayan Valley Rising Suns
 CEU Scorpions
 Cignal HD Spikers
 College of Saint Benilde

D
 D' Navigators Iloilo
 De La Salle University - Dasmariñas
 De La Salle University - Manila

E
 Emilio Aguinaldo College
 Easy Trip–Raimol

F
 Far Eastern University
 Fourbees Cavite Patriots Total Attackers

I
 Imus City–AJAA Spikers 
 IEM Volley Masters

L
 Lyceum of the Philippines University

M
 Mapúa Institute of Technology

N
 National College of Business and Arts
 National University
 NU-Archipelago Builders

P
 Philippine Air Force Air Spikers
 Philippine Army Troopers
 Army-Katinko Troopers
 Philippine Coast Guard Dolphins
 Philippine Merchant Marine School
 Philippines national team
 Philippine Navy Fighting Stingrays
 PGJC Navy Sea Lions
 PLDT Home Ultera Ultra Fast Hitters

R
 Rizal Technological University

S
 Santa Rosa City Lions
 Sta. Elena Ball Hammers
 San Beda College
 San Sebastian College – Recoletos

U
 University of the East
 University of Perpetual Help System DALTA
 University of the Philippines - Diliman
 University of Santo Tomas

V
 Vanguard Volley Hitters
 Volleyball Never Stops
 Bounty Fresh (2016 Open)
 100 Plus Active Spikers (2016 Reinforced)
 Café Lupe Sunrisers (2017–2018)
 Fury Blazing Hitters (2018)
 VNS Griffins (2019, 2023–present)
 VNS-One Alicia Griffins (2022 Open)

See also
 Premier Volleyball League
 Shakey's V-League

References

Teams